The Premier of Niue is Niue's head of government. They are elected by the Niue Assembly, and forms a Cabinet consisting of themselves and three other members of the Assembly.

Sir Robert Rex was continuously re-elected every three years from Niue's independence in 1974 until his death in 1992.

List of officeholders
Key

See also
 Politics of Niue
 Patu-iki
 List of Niuean monarchs
 List of resident commissioners of Niue

References

External links
 World Statesmen – Niue

Politics of Niue
Government of Niue
Niue, List of Premiers of
 
Premier